Meet Me in Las Vegas (1956) is an MGM musical comedy produced by Joe Pasternak, directed by Roy Rowland, filmed in Eastman Color and CinemaScope, and starring Dan Dailey and Cyd Charisse.

The screenplay is by Isobel Lennart, cinematography by Robert Bronner, music direction by George Stoll, and choreography by Hermes Pan and Eugene Loring. It was largely shot on location shooting in Las Vegas and several popular celebrities are featured as themselves.

Plot
Set in and around the Sands Hotel, the film tells "what happens when a gambling rancher discovers that all he has to do to win at roulette is take hold of ballerina Charisse's hand". The film was tailored for the talents of Charisse, showcasing her modern ballet dancing.

Cast
 Dan Dailey as Chuck Rodwell
 Cyd Charisse as Maria Corvier
 Agnes Moorehead as Miss Hattie
 Lili Darvas as Sari Hatvany
 Jim Backus as Tom Culdane
 Oskar Karlweis as Lotzi - Sands Blackjack Dealer
 Liliane Montevecchi as Lilli
 Cara Williams as Kelly Donavan
 George Chakiris as Young Groom (as George Kerris)
 Betty Lynn as Young Bride
 Henry Slate as Slate Brother
 Jack Slate as Slate Brother
 Sid Slate as Slate Brother
 Pete Rugolo as Conductor
 John Brascia as Specialty Dancer

There are brief appearances by The Four Aces, Jerry Colonna, Paul Henreid, Lena Horne, Frankie Laine, and Mitsuko Sawamura. Cameo appearances include Frank Sinatra, Debbie Reynolds, Vic Damone, Pier Angeli, Peter Lorre, and Tony Martin (who was married to Charisse).

Sammy Davis Jr. sings "Frankie and Johnny", danced by Charisse, Montevecchi, and Brascia, with special lyrics by Sammy Cahn and arranged by Johnny Green.

Reception
According to MGM records, the $2.5M film earned $2,217,000 in the US and Canada and $1,497,000 elsewhere, resulting in a profit of $496,000.

Honors
The film received an Oscar nomination for Best Musical Score.

Home media
The film was released on DVD from Warner Brothers Archive Collection on July 8, 2011.

See also
 List of American films of 1956
 List of films set in Las Vegas

References

External links
 Meet Me in Las Vegas in the Internet Movie Database
 
 
 

1956 films
1956 musical comedy films
CinemaScope films
American musical comedy films
Films directed by Roy Rowland
Films produced by Joe Pasternak
Films scored by Georgie Stoll
Films scored by Johnny Green
Films set in the Las Vegas Valley
Films shot in the Las Vegas Valley
Films about gambling
Metro-Goldwyn-Mayer films
1950s English-language films
1950s American films